LLN may refer to:
 Law of large numbers, a theorem in probability and statistics
 Les Légions Noires, a group of French black metal bands
 Louvain-la-Neuve, a university city and campus of the University of Louvain, in Belgium
 Loudlabs News, a stringer company featured on Netflix's Shot in the Dark
 Lower limit of normal, the low limit of a reference range